The Fender Esquire is a solid-body electric guitar manufactured by Fender. The Esquire was the first solid-body guitar sold by Fender, debuting in 1950. Shortly after its introduction, a two-pickup version was built. It was soon renamed the Broadcaster later that year; the single pickup version retained the Esquire name. The Gretsch Company at the time marketed a drum set under the 'Broadkaster' name, and at their request, Fender dropped the Broadcaster name, eventually renaming their guitar the "Telecaster". The more versatile Broadcaster/Telecaster has since become one of Fender's most popular models with dozens of variations produced. Once the Telecaster was introduced, the Esquire became marketed as a lower-cost version. Over the following two decades, the availability of other low-cost models saw the Esquire's sales decline and the model was discontinued in 1969.

The model has since been reissued but remains a relatively "niche" guitar. Esquire users today prefer the model's increased treble over the Telecaster. Although the Esquire was the original model introduced, given the popularity and uninterrupted production of the Telecaster, the limited reissued Esquire models are generally regarded and billed as variants of the Telecaster.

Early development 

The first prototype for the Esquire (and the later Telecaster) was completed by Leo Fender and George Fullerton in the fall of 1949. The prototype introduced the now-familiar square edged, dreadnought body shape with single cutaway to allow easier access to the upper frets. Likewise, it already featured the distinctive combination bridge and pickup assembly, using the pickup from Fender's "Champion" lap steel guitar, with its individual pole pieces for each string, mounted at a slant, and the three bridge saddles which allow adjustment of intonation only in pairs, but individual string height.

The neck, like the first Esquires manufactured in 1950, was made from a single piece of maple without a separate fret board or truss rod. The neck was attached to the body with four screws and an anchor plate, unlike in traditional guitar construction, where a tenon on the neck is glued into the body. Unlike the Esquire, the neck was wider at the nut, and the head had 3 tuners on each side. The prototype differed from the later production guitars in several other respects: the body was made of pinewood, it was painted opaque white, its pickguard did not extend below the strings, it lacked a selector switch, and its volume and tone knobs were mounted on a slanted plate. Like the production models, it had a removable pickup cover, but unlike the production models, the cover had straight sides. The prototype had only one pickup, as did Esquires manufactured from 1951 onwards.

Over the winter of 1949/50, Fender refined the design. The neck width at the nut was narrowed to 1 5/8", and the head modified to accommodate all six tuners on one side, inspired by a Croatian design that Fender liked. A tone selector switch was added, and the controls were mounted on a plate parallel to the strings. The scratch plate (pickguard) was enlarged. During late spring of 1950, Fender had added a second (Champion steel) pickup in the neck position. It was soon redesigned to pick around more easily with a smaller pickup, and encased in a metal shielding cover designed by Karl Olmstead (tool & die makers Race & Olmstead). However, this last feature was not to make it onto Fender's commercially advertised guitar, as Fender's distributor, the Radio & Television Equipment Company (RTEC), had decided that it would be easier to sell the single pickup version of the guitar.

The 1950 Esquire 

The single pickup guitar was first manufactured in March 1950, and made its commercial debut as the Esquire in Don Randall's RTEC Spring catalogue of that year. While the guitar pictured in the catalog was painted black with a white pickguard, later Esquires produced at the time were painted with semi-transparent blonde acetate lacquer, which over the years faded to a "butterscotch" blonde, and the pickguard was a black phenolic pickguard.
Unlike the laminated 1.5" thick pine and ash wood samples, the Broadcaster was 1.75" and made of solid ash. The dual pickup version was first manufactured in May and June of that year. Neither early Esquire versions had a truss rod at that time, Fullerton’s father Fred Fullerton developed the truss reinforcement design still in use today.
By October, the revised dual pickup version acquired one and was renamed the Broadcaster. Following objections via a telegram sent to Don Randall from Gretsch, who produced the "Broadkaster" banjo and drum kit, this iconic name was dropped.  Numerous guitars were shipped in 1951 with the clipped "Fender" logo decal and no model name, these days referred to as the "Nocaster", until the name Telecaster was adopted in August. Don held a contest and no one came up with a suitable name. Television was just becoming popular and the name stuck. 
The guitar was designed as an electronic instrument with no acoustic manipulation of the tone. Rather the guitar's pickup was designed and placed to transmit the richest signal for later manipulation by the tone switch and other electronics.

The Esquire from 1951 to 1969 

Following the renaming of the dual pickup Broadcaster, production and promotion of the single pickup Esquire was briefly discontinued. It was reintroduced with a truss rod in January of 1951. The only external differences between these second generation Esquires and the Broadcasters and Telecasters of 1951 are the lack of a neck pickup, and the Esquire label on the head. Although the Esquire had only a single pickup, it retained the three-way switch of the two-pickup guitars. This switch modified the tone of the pickup by adding more bass in the forward position, while enabling use of the tone control knob in the middle position. With the switch in the rear position, these tone controls were bypassed entirely for a "hotter" lead tone.

Like the two-pickup guitar, these Esquires had a routed cavity in the neck pickup position. Thus, with the purchase of a neck pickup and replacement or modification of the pickguard, players could upgrade their instrument to a guitar identical to the Telecaster in every respect except for the model decal. Bruce Springsteen, for example, has long played an Esquire modified in this way. Springsteen has claimed that the guitar he is pictured with on the Born to Run album cover is, in fact, a hybrid of two guitars, a Telecaster body and Esquire neck. However, it is actually a first-generation Esquire with two pickup routs. The Esquires had Esquire pickguards to cover the neck pickup rout; Springsteen's guitar has a neck pickup installed, but not connected.

The initial rationale for reintroducing the single pickup Esquire in 1951 had been to offer a more affordable option for musicians who could not afford the two-pickup guitar. However, with the introduction of cheaper student models such as the Mustang, the more expensive Esquire became a less attractive option, and it was sold in smaller and smaller quantities. Consequently, Fender discontinued the Esquire in 1969.

From 1986 to present 

In 1986, Fender Japan began producing the Esquire, based on the 1954 version and under the brand "Squier by Fender". It featured threaded saddles and a white pickguard with either a butterscotch blonde or metallic red finish. Some people report that there was also a blackguard version, as well as a sunburst finish. These Esquires were imported to the USA.

The Fender Custom Shop also manufactures a 1959 Esquire reproduction as part of its "Time Machine" series, a model distinguished by its top-loading bridge design. It is also notable that the Avril Lavigne signature Telecaster sold under the Squier by Fender brand resembles an Esquire since it only has a single pickup. Although the pickup in the Avril Lavigne Telecaster is a humbucker rather than the usual single coil, the guitar also features a 3-way selector switch that allows the player to isolate one coil of the pickup at a time, thus offering single coil tones just like the Esquire or even a normal Telecaster, or both coils at the same time for the intended humbucker sound.

Notable players

The use of the Fender Esquire by several country musicians is popularly credited for the creation of one of the most distinctive and recognized sounds in American music history.
Jimmy Wyble with Spade Cooley was the first Esquire endorser for Don Randall's advertisements. George and Leo took a new Broadcaster out to show Jimmy Bryant at the Rancho Reveler soon afterwards. He first played it on the edge of the stage with an admiring crowd up close. In 1954 Luther Perkins played a slightly modified Esquire, recording the first Johnny Cash songs "Wide Open Road" and "Hey Porter". This guitar can also be heard on all records before "I Walk The Line", for which Perkins played an Esquire. Throughout his career Perkins used various Esquires. With this guitar, Perkins created the legendary "Boom Chicka Boom Sound" that identified Johnny Cash's music.

Steve Cropper with Booker T played his fifties Esquire through a Fender Harvard amplifier for tunes such as Green Onions and Dock of the Bay with Otis Redding.

Bruce Springsteen has used a 1953 Fender Esquire as his main touring and recording guitar throughout his career. He can be seen holding the guitar on the cover of his 1975 album Born To Run. Springsteen's guitar is a combination of an Esquire neck and Telecaster body. He bought the guitar in 1971 in Belmar, NJ, for 185 dollars.

David Hekhouse of The Tearaways tours with a 1959 Esquire.

In 1966, Paul McCartney purchased a 1964 Fender Esquire model with a sunburst finish and rosewood fretboard. Though the guitar was a right-handed model, McCartney restrung it for left-handed playing. McCartney would use it on "Good Morning, Good Morning" for the Beatles' album Sgt. Pepper's Lonely Hearts Club Band, and on "Helter Skelter" for The Beatles double album.

Jeff Beck used a 1954 Esquire with the Yardbirds to create the famous guitar parts on "Over Under Sideways Down", "Shapes of Things", "I'm a Man," and "Heart Full of Soul". Beck bought it from the Walker Brothers guitarist John Maus while on tour with them. Maus had hand-shaved the body to be contoured like a Stratocaster. This guitar has significant wear and now belongs to pickup designer Seymour Duncan; Beck gave him the guitar as a return favor after Duncan built his famous Tele-Gib guitar for him.

Syd Barrett, the original leader of Pink Floyd, was another prominent Esquire player. His successor David Gilmour used an Esquire with an added pickup on several songs, including "Dogs," "Run Like Hell" and his work on Paul McCartney's album Run Devil Run. Gilmour also uses an Esquire on his 2015 solo album, Rattle That Lock, notably on many of the album's guitar solos.

On the single, "Born to Be Wild" by Steppenwolf, guitarist Michael Monarch played an Esquire.

At Eagles 1977's live performance at the Capital Centre, Joe Walsh used an Esquire for a majority of the performance.

Roger Taylor, drummer with the rock band Queen, played a 1967 Esquire on the track "Sheer Heart Attack". Brian May played the same guitar on "Crazy Little Thing Called Love"; having been unable to find a 'Telecaster sound' reminiscent of 1950's era James Burton with his primary guitar the Red Special, producer Reinhold Mack suggested he "just use a Telecaster".

See also
 Fender Telecaster
 List of Telecaster players (includes Esquire players)

Citations

References

External links

 Esquire Classic, with some history.
 Index of Esquire models from 2006.
 Fender Esquire resource site

Esquire
1950 musical instruments
Musical instruments invented in the 1950s
The Beatles' musical instruments